Dutch Hill is a small mountain range located in Central New York Region of New York located in the Town of Frankfort in Herkimer County, west-northwest of Frankfort.

References

Mountains of Herkimer County, New York
Mountains of New York (state)